Eduardo Ernesto Lonardi Doucet (September 15, 1896 – March 22, 1956) was an Argentine Lieutenant General and served as de facto president from September 23 to November 13, 1955.

Biography
Lonardi was born on September 15, 1896.

Lonardi was appointed military attache to Chile during the presidency of Ramón Castillo in 1942, but shortly afterwards he was declared "persona non grata" by the Chilean government on accusations of espionage. Returning to Argentina, he participated in the coup that overthrew Castillo. He then was appointed military attache to Washington, DC around 1946 where he stayed for a few years. He then permanently returned to Argentina.

President of Argentina

Eduardo Lonardi, a Catholic nationalist, assumed leadership of the Revolución Libertadora junta that overthrew Juan Perón on September 16, 1955. He was greeted by chants of Cristo Vence ("Christ is Victorious") when arriving in Buenos Aires. Favoring a transition with "neither victors nor vanquished", his conciliatory approach was deemed too soft by the liberal faction of the armed forces, who deposed him less than two months into his de facto presidency and replaced him with hard-liner Pedro Aramburu.

Later years and death
He went to the United States to receive cancer treatment. He returned to Argentina and died on 22 March 1956 from cancer.

References

1896 births
1956 deaths
People from Buenos Aires
Argentine people of Italian descent
Presidents of Argentina
Argentine generals
Argentine spies
Leaders who took power by coup
Leaders ousted by a coup
Deaths from cancer in Argentina
Burials at La Recoleta Cemetery